CIIM - The Cyprus International Institute of Management is a European business school with two campuses, one in Nicosia and one in Limassol, Cyprus. The non-profit business school is accredited by the Cyprus Ministry of Education & Culture. The school is a member of the European Foundation for Management Development.

Postgraduate Programmes
 MBA - Master of Business Administration (international accreditation by EPAS temporarily suspended due to major restructuring) 
 MSc Business Intelligence & Data Analytics 
 MBM – MSc in Business Management
 MSc Financial Services
 MSc Human Resource Management & Organisational Behaviour
 Master of Public Sector Management (international accreditation by EPAS temporarily suspended due to major restructuring) 
 MSc Εκπαίδευση, Ηγεσία & Διοίκηση

Personal & professional development programmes
 Professional English
 CIIM Summer School
 Learn to code with Python

Accreditation
CIIM is a member of the European Foundation for Management Development and the Association to Advance Collegiate Schools of Business. In 2018, the school was ranked among the top 25 performing universities in income from continuous professional development on the U-Multirank rankings, an EU sponsored global university ranking program.

Teaching Methods
The school practices interactive teaching to enable students to put classroom concepts and theories into real world practice. These include team exercises, role plays, case studies, simulation games and "live" projects.

History
CIIM – The Cyprus International Institute of Management is a non-profit international business school established in 1990 by a group including the former General Manager of Cyprus Development Bank, John Joannides and Costas Constantinides the former chairman of Electricity Authority of Cyprus and a team of academics representing some of the world’s business schools.

See also
Education in Cyprus

References

Business schools in Europe
Universities and colleges in Cyprus
Educational institutions established in 1990
1990 establishments in Cyprus